Dawsholm Railway Station (Grid Reference NS562689) was a railway station in Glasgow, Scotland. The station opened for passengers on 1 October 1896 and closed on 1 May 1908 but Dawsholm locomotive shed, code 65D, continued in use until 1964.

See also
 List of closed railway stations in Britain: D-F

References

Disused railway stations in Glasgow
Former Caledonian Railway stations
Railway stations in Great Britain opened in 1896
Railway stations in Great Britain closed in 1908
1908 disestablishments in Scotland